Major General Sir Edward Northey  (28 May 1868 – 25 December 1953) was a senior British Army officer of the First World War who commanded a brigade on the Western Front until wounded in 1915. Returning to service in 1916, Northey took command of a colonial force in Nyasaland in the East African campaign, later becoming Governor of Kenya. He later served as a general of Territorial forces and retired in 1926.

Birth and early career
Edward Northey was born in 1868 at Cockerham, Lancashire and educated at Eton College and the Royal Military College, Sandhurst, being commissioned into the King's Royal Rifle Corps as a second lieutenant on 7 March 1888. He was promoted to lieutenant on 7 May 1890, and served in expeditions to Hazara and the Miranzai Valley in 1891 and one to Isazai the following year. Promotion to captain followed on 1 July 1895. From late 1899, Northey took part in the Second Boer War, remaining in South Africa until 1902. On his return, he was appointed adjutant of a volunteer battalion, the 1st Middlesex Rifles (Victoria and St. George′s).

First World War
When the First World War broke out in 1914, Northey was a lieutenant colonel in the King's Royal Rifle Corps and served with the regiment on the Western Front during the first year of the war. In March 1915, Northey was promoted to brigadier-general and took over the 15th Infantry Brigade but was seriously wounded during the Second Battle of Ypres. The date is unclear, but Northey was reportedly surveying the site of a new communication trench when he was struck in the thigh by shrapnel.

Returning to the army in 1916 after recovering from his wound, Northey was posted to Nyasaland in command of the Nyasa-Rhodesia Field Force, operating against Lettow-Vorbeck's indigenous and German forces in the East African Campaign.
Northey was appointed Companion of the Order of the Bath in 1917 and was appointed Knight of the Order of St Michael and St George in 1918 for his war service, the same year he was promoted to major-general. He was elevated Knight Grand Cross of the Order of St Michael and St George.

Governor of the British East Africa Protectorate

At the war's end Northey was appointed Governor of the British East Africa Protectorate, which became known as Kenya in 1920.

On 16 October 1919 The Times newspaper reported that Sir Edward Northey had met with an accident, while playing polo, which required the removal of his right eye. The accident occurred in British East Africa.

In 1919, Northey issued a circular which instructed government officials to coerce African labour to work on European-owned farms and estates, despite earlier Colonial Office objections to this plan. The scandal generated by the Northey proposal caused the Colonial Office to make clear in 1921 that compulsory paid labour by local Africans could only be used on government projects, not to direct labour to European estates, and then only if absolutely necessary and with Colonial Office approval.

In 1922, Northey was transferred to the lesser post of High Commissioner of Zanzibar, returning to Britain in 1924 to return to military service.

Late career

On his return, Northey was placed in command of the 43rd (Wessex) Infantry Division, a Territorial Army formation. This responsibility was shared with command of the South West Area of Britain, and Northey performed well at both duties until his retirement from military service in 1926. Northey died in 1953 after a peaceful retirement.

Notes 

1868 births
1953 deaths
British Army major generals

Graduates of the Royal Military College, Sandhurst

King's Royal Rifle Corps officers
British Army personnel of the Second Boer War
British Army generals of World War I
Companions of the Order of the Bath
Knights Grand Cross of the Order of St Michael and St George
Colonial governors and administrators of Kenya
Nyasaland in World War I
British Kenya people